Honorific orders or similar decorations received by the Norwegian royal family, classified by continent, awarding country and recipient, include the following:

Norwegian honours

European foreign honours

Austria 

 Harald V of Norway: Grand Star of the Decoration of Honour for Services to the Republic of Austria (1964)
 Queen Sonja of Norway: Grand Star of the Decoration of Honour for Services to the Republic of Austria (1978)
 Crown Prince Haakon: Grand Decoration of Honour in Gold with Sash for Services to the Republic of Austria (2007)
 Crown Princess Mette-Marit: Grand Decoration of Honour in Gold with Sash for Services to the Republic of Austria (2007)

Belgium 
 Harald V of Norway: Grand Cordon of the Order of Leopold 
 Queen Sonja of Norway: Grand Cordon of the Order of Leopold 
 Princess Astrid of Norway: Grand Cross of the Order of the Crown

Bulgaria 
 Harald V of Norway: Cordon of the Order of Stara Planina  
 Queen Sonja of Norway: Cordon of the Order of Stara Planina  
 Haakon, Crown Prince of Norway: Cordon of the Order of Stara Planina  
 Mette-Marit, Crown Princess of Norway: Cordon of the Order of Stara Planina

Croatia 
 Harald V of Norway: Grand Order of King Tomislav
 Queen Sonja of Norway: Grand Order of Queen Jelena

Denmark 

 Harald V of Norway:
 Knight of the Order of the Elephant  (21.02.1958)
 Grand Commander of the Order of the Dannebrog  (28.10.1991)
 Queen Sonja of Norway: 
 Knight of the Order of the Elephant (12.02.1973)
 Haakon, Crown Prince of Norway:
 Knight of the Order of the Elephant (20.07.1991)
 Mette-Marit, Crown Princess of Norway:
 Knight of the Order of the Elephant (17.05.2014)
 Princess Ingrid Alexandra of Norway:
 Knight of the Order of the Elephant (21.01.2022)
 Princess Märtha Louise of Norway:
 Knight of the Order of the Elephant (13.10.1992)

Estonia 

 Harald V of Norway: Collar of the Order of the Cross of Terra Mariana  (24.08.1998)
 Collar of the Order of the White Star (02.09.2014)
 Queen Sonja of Norway: 1st Class of the Order of the Cross of Terra Mariana (24.08.1998)
 Member 1st Class of the Order of the White Star (02.09.2014)
 Haakon, Crown Prince of Norway: 1st Class of the Order of the Cross of Terra Mariana  (02.04.2002)
1st Class of the Order of the White Star (02.09.2014)
 Mette-Marit, Crown Princess of Norway: 1st Class of the Order of the Cross of Terra Mariana (02.04.2002) 
 Member 1st Class of the Order of the White Star  (02.09.2014)

Finland 
 Harald V of Norway: Commander Grand Cross with Collar of the Order of the White Rose of Finland 
 Queen Sonja of Norway: Commander Grand Cross of the Order of the White Rose of Finland 
 Haakon, Crown Prince of Norway: Commander Grand Cross of the Order of the White Rose of Finland 
 Mette-Marit, Crown Princess of Norway: Commander Grand Cross of the Order of the White Rose of Finland 
 Princess Märtha Louise of Norway: Commander Grand Cross of the Order of the White Rose of Finland
 Princess Astrid of Norway: Commander Grand Cross of the Order of the White Rose of Finland

France 
 Harald V of Norway: Grand Cross of the Legion of Honour
 Queen Sonja of Norway: Grand Cross of the National Order of Merit
 Princess Astrid of Norway: Grand Cross of the National Order of Merit

Germany 
 Harald V of Norway: Grand Cross Special Class of the Order of Merit of the Federal Republic of Germany 
 Queen Sonja of Norway: Grand Cross Special Class of the Order of Merit of the Federal Republic of Germany
 Haakon, Crown Prince of Norway: Grand Cross 1st Class of the Order of Merit of the Federal Republic of Germany
 Crown Princess Mette-Marit of Norway: Grand Cross 1st Class of the Order of Merit of the Federal Republic of Germany
 Princess Astrid of Norway: Grand Cross 1st class of the Order of Merit of the Federal Republic of Germany

Greece 
 Harald V of Norway - :
 Knight Grand Cross of the Order of the Redeemer
 The Royal House of Greece Centenary Medal
 Queen Sonja of Norway: Knight Grand Cross of the Order of the Redeemer

Hungary 
 Harald V of Norway: Grand Cross with Collar of the Order of Merit of the Republic of Hungary
 Queen Sonja of Norway: Grand Cross of the Order of Merit of the Republic of Hungary

Iceland 

 Harald V of Norway: Grand Cross (25.05.1955) with Collar (26.10.1993) of the Order of the Falcon
 Queen Sonja of Norway: Grand Cross of the Order of the Falcon (21/10/1981)
 Crown Prince Haakon of Norway: Grand Cross of the Order of the Falcon (21.03.2017)
 Crown Princess Mette-Marit of Norway: Grand Cross of the Order of the Falcon (21.03.2017)
 Princess Märtha Louise of Norway: Grand Cross of the Order of the Falcon (26.10.1993)
 Princess Astrid of Norway: Grand Cross of the Order of the Falcon(26.10.1993)

Italy 

Italian Presidency website, decorations: Olav - Harald Grand Cross - Collar - Sonja - Haakon - Mette-Marit

 Harald V of Norway: Knight Grand Cross (06/1965) with Collar (10/2001) of the Order of Merit of the Italian Republic 
 Queen Sonja of Norway: Knight Grand Cross of the Order of Merit of the Italian Republic (10/2001) 
 Haakon, Crown Prince of Norway: Knight Grand Cross of the Order of Merit of the Italian Republic (09/2004) 
 Mette-Marit, Crown Princess of Norway: Knight Grand Cross of the Order of Merit of the Italian Republic (09/2004)

Latvia 

 Harald V of Norway: Commander Grand Cross with Chain of the Order of the Three Stars  (1998)
 Grand Cross of the Order of Viesturs (2015)
 Queen Sonja of Norway: Commander Grand Cross of the Order of the Three Stars  (1998)
 Grand cross of the Order of Recognition (2015)
 Haakon, Crown Prince of Norway: Commander Grand Cross of the Order of the Three Stars  (2000)
 Grand cross of the Order of Recognition (2015)
 Mette Marit, Crown Princess of Norway: Grand cross of the Order of Recognition (2015)

Lithuania 

 Harald V of Norway: Grand Cross (1998) with Golden Chain (2011) of the Order of Vytautas the Great
 Queen Sonja of Norway: Grand Cross of the Order of Vytautas the Great (March 2011)
 Haakon, Crown Prince of Norway: Grand Cross of the Order of Vytautas the Great (March 2011)
 Mette-Marit, Crown Princess of Norway: Grand Cross of the Order of Vytautas the Great (March 2011)

Luxembourg 

 Harald V of Norway:
 Grand Cross of the Order of Adolph of Nassau
 Knight of the Order of the Gold Lion of the House of Nassau
 Medal to commemorate the wedding of Grand Duke Jean and Grand Duchess Josephine-Charlotte
 Queen Sonja of Norway:
 Grand Cross of the Order of Adolph of Nassau
 Knight of the Order of the Gold Lion of the House of Nassau
 Haakon, Crown Prince of Norway: Grand Cross of the Order of Adolph of Nassau (May 2011)
 Mette-Marit, Crown Princess of Norway: Grand Cross of the Order of Adolphe of Nassau (May 2011)
 Princess Märtha Louise of Norway: Grand Cross of the Order of Adolph of Nassau (May 2011)
 Princess Astrid of Norway: Grand Cross of the Order of Adolphe of Nassau

Netherlands 
 Harald V of Norway:
 Knight Grand Cross of the Order of the Netherlands Lion  
 Grand Cross of the Order of the Crown 
 Commander of the Order of the Golden Ark 
 Medal to commemorate the enthronement of Queen Beatrix 
 Queen Sonja of Norway:
 Knight Grand Cross of the Order of the Netherlands Lion  
 Grand Cross of the Order of the Crown (1986)
 Medal to commemorate the enthronement of Queen Beatrix
 Haakon, Crown Prince of Norway:
Knight Grand Cross with swords of the Order of Orange-Nassau  
 Recipient of the King Willem-Alexander Inauguration Medal
 Mette-Marit, Crown Princess of Norway:
Knight Grand Cross of the Order of Orange-Nassau  
 Recipient of the King Willem-Alexander Inauguration Medal
 Princess Märtha Louise of Norway:
Grand Cross of the Order of the Crown 
 Princess Astrid of Norway:
Grand Cross of the Order of the Crown

Poland 
 Harald V of Norway: Knight of the Order of the White Eagle 
 Queen Sonja of Norway: Knight of the Order of the White Eagle
 Haakon, Crown Prince of Norway: Grand Cross of the Order of Merit of the Republic of Poland 
 Mette-Marit, Crown Princess of Norway: Grand Cross of the Order of Merit of the Republic of Poland

Portugal 
Decorations awarded:

 Harald V of Norway:
 Grand Cross of the Military Order of Aviz (05/11/1980)
 Grand Collar of the Order of Infante Dom Henrique (13/02/2004)
 Grand Cross with Collar of the Order of St. James of the Sword (26/05/2008) 
 Queen Sonja of Norway:
 Grand Cross of the Order of Merit of Portugal (02/01/1981)
 Grand Cross of the Order of Infante Dom Henrique (13/02/2004)
 Grand Cross of the Order of Christ (26/05/2008)
 Haakon, Crown Prince of Norway: Grand Cross of the Order of Infante Dom Henrique (13/02/2004)
 Mette-Marit, Crown Princess of Norway: Grand Cross of the Order of Infante Dom Henrique (13/02/2004)
 Princess Märtha Louise of Norway: Grand Cross of the Order of Infante Dom Henrique (13/02/2004)
 Princess Astrid of Norway: Grand Cross of the Order of Merit (Portugal) (02/01/1981)

Romania 

 Harald V of Norway: Collar of the Order of the Star of Romania  (1999)

Slovakia 

 Harald V of Norway: Grand Cross (or 1st Class) of the Order of the White Double Cross (2010)
 Queen Sonja of Norway: Member 2st Class of the Order of the White Double Cross (2010)

Slovenia 
 Harald V of Norway: Recipient of the Decoration for Exceptional Merits (09/05/2011)
 Queen Sonja of Norway: Recipient of the Decoration for Exceptional Merits (09/05/2011)
 Haakon, Crown Prince of Norway: Recipient of the Golden Order of Merit in the military or security field (06/11/2019)

Spain 

 Harald V of Norway:
 1,192nd Knight of the Order of the Golden Fleece (21/04/1995)
 Knight Grand Cross of the Order of Charles III (12/04/1982)
 Knight Collar of the Order of Charles III (30/06/2006)
 Queen Sonja of Norway:
 Dame Grand Cross of the Order of Charles III (21/04/1995)
 Dame Grand Cross of the Order of Isabella the Catholic (12/04/1982)
 Haakon, Crown Prince of Norway: Knight Grand Cross of the Order of Charles III (26/05/2006)
 Mette-Marit, Crown Princess of Norway: Dame Grand Cross of the Order of Isabella the Catholic (26/05/2006)
 Princess Märtha Louise of Norway: Dame Grand Cross of the Order of Civil Merit (02/06/2006)
 Princess Astrid of Norway: Dame Grand Cross of the Order of Isabella the Catholic (12/04/1982)

Sweden 
 Harald V of Norway: Knight with Collar of the Order of the Seraphim
Recipient of the 90th Birthday Medal of King Gustaf V
Recipient of the 50th Birthday Badge Medal of King Carl XVI Gustaf (30/04/1996)
 Recipient of the Ruby Jubilee Badge Medal of King Carl XVI Gustaf (15/09/2013)
 Queen Sonja of Norway: Member of the Order of the Seraphim  
 Recipient of the 50th Birthday Badge Medal of King Carl XVI Gustaf (30/04/1996)
 Recipient of the Ruby Jubilee Badge Medal of King Carl XVI Gustaf (15/09/2013)
 Haakon, Crown Prince of Norway: Knight of the Order of the Seraphim  
 Mette-Marit, Crown Princess of Norway: Commander Grand Cross of the Order of the Polar Star 
 Princess Märtha Louise of Norway: Commander Grand Cross of the Order of the Polar Star
Recipient of the 50th Birthday Badge Medal of King Carl XVI Gustaf (30/04/1996)
 Recipient of the 70th Birthday Badge Medal of King Carl XVI Gustaf
 Princess Astrid of Norway: Commander Grand Cross of the Order of the Polar Star
Recipient of the 90th Birthday Medal of King Gustaf V
Recipient of the 50th Birthday Badge Medal of King Carl XVI Gustaf (30/04/1996)

Turkey 

 Harald V of Norway: Member 1st Class of the Order of the State of Republic of Turkey

United Kingdom 

 Harald V of Norway:
 Honorary Knight Grand Cross of the Royal Victorian Order (1955)
 Recipient of the Royal Victorian Chain (1994)
 Stranger Knight of the Order of the Garter (990th member; 2001)
 Honorary Freedom of Newcastle upon Tyne

Yugoslavia 

 Harald V of Norway: Order of the Yugoslav Great Star

American foreign honours

Argentina
 Harald V of Norway: Collar of the Order of the Liberator General San Martín
 Queen Sonja of Norway: Grand Cross of the Order of May

Brazil 
 Harald V of Norway: Grand Collar of the Order of the Southern Cross 
 Queen Sonja of Norway: Grand Cross of the Order of the Southern Cross
 Haakon, Crown Prince of Norway: Grand Cross of the Order of the Southern Cross
 Mette-Marit, Crown Princess of Norway: Grand Cross of the Order of the Southern Cross

Chile 
 Harald V of Norway: Collar of the Order of the Merit 
 Queen Sonja of Norway: Grand Cross of the Order of the Merit

African foreign honours

South Africa 

 Harald V of Norway: Grand Cross of the Order of Good Hope

Asian foreign honours

Middle East

Jordan 
 Harald V of Norway: Collar of the Order of al-Hussein bin Ali 
 Queen Sonja of Norway: Grand Cordon of the Supreme Order of the Renaissance (Order of Al-Nahda)
 Haakon, Crown Prince of Norway: Grand Cordon of the Supreme Order of the Renaissance  (Order of Al-Nahda)
 Princess Märtha Louise of Norway: Grand Cross of the Order of the Star of Jordan  (Order of Al-Kawkab Al Urdoni)
 Princess Astrid of Norway: Grand Cross of the Order of the Star of Jordan  (Al-Kawkab Al Urdoni)

Far East

Japan 
 Harald V of Norway: Collar of the Order of the Chrysanthemum 
 Queen Sonja of Norway: Grand Cordon (Paulownia) of the Order of the Precious Crown  
 Haakon, Crown Prince of Norway: Grand Cordon of the Order of the Chrysanthemum  
 Mette-Marit, Crown Princess of Norway: Grand Cordon (Paulownia) of the Order of the Precious Crown

South Korea 
 Harald V of Norway: Recipient of the Grand Order of Mugunghwa 
 Queen Sonja of Norway: Grand Gwanghwa Medal of the Order of Diplomatic Service Merit

Thailand 
 Harald V of Norway: Knight Grand Cordon (Special Class) of the Order of Chula Chom Klao 
 Princess Astrid of Norway: Grand Cross of the Order of Chula Chom Klao

See also 
 List of state visits made by King Haakon VII of Norway
 List of state visits made by King Olav V of Norway
 List of state visits made by King Harald V of Norway
 List of Norwegian Honours awarded to Heads of State and Royals

References 

Orders, decorations, and medals of Norway
Norway